Gurukul is a 2015 Indian Marathi-language film, written and directed by Rommel Rodrigues in a directorial debut. It stars Nagesh Bhosle and Vidyadhar Joshi as the two main protagonists supported by a slew of artists like Asit Redij, Swapnil Joshi, Pradeep Kuwar, Prashant Mohite, Neha Khan, Reenna Liman, Sonali Shewale and others. The story focuses on a quest of former students to restore the glory of their institute from where they got their higher education Gurukul and release it from the clutches from the hands of greed politician who had usurped it by fraudulent means.

Plot
Gurukul is a story of an upright educationalist Nansaheb Vishwanath Gokhale, fondly called as Guruji (played by Nagesh Bhosle) who is the founder and head of Gurukul University. As a teacher Guruji is different from others and deals with the students in a gentle and tolerant manner. He believes along with professional education, students should put emphasis on moral and social values of life. Reflecting the politicisation of education institutions in India, Gurukul is fraudulently grabbed by a local politician Girish Bhao Velangekar (played by Vidyadhar Joshi), saddened by which Guruji leaves for unknown destination. The story shows the quest of the 6 former students who are now married couple to search, fight and restore the glory of Gurukul's former head Guruji, where in the end climax his moral greatness is reflected.

Soundtrack

The soundtrack of the film consisted of four tracks composed by Sanjay Raj Gaurinandan and lyrics by Prashant Ingole, Rajesh Bamugade and Madhukar Arkade.

Famous singer Asha Bhosle has sung a intense Lavani (Marathi Folksong) with lyrics penned by famous lyricist Prashant Ingole who has blockbuster films to his credit like Race 2, Bajirao Mastani, Mary Kom, Daddy etc.

Music label 
Zee Music Company

Box office
Gurukul was released in 135 theaters across the state and opened to an average opening day occupancy. The film premiered on Zee Talkies on 1 July 2016.

References 

2010s Marathi-language films